Rashid Kadyrkaev (born in Uzbek SSR) is an Uzbeki retired pair skater who competed internationally for the Soviet Union.

Career
Kadyrkaev first had success internationally skating with Marina Nikitiuk. They were coached by Valeri Tyukov. Nikitiuk and Kadyrkaev won the silver medal at the 1980 World Junior Figure Skating Championships and the bronze medal at the 1981 Junior Worlds. He now lives in the United States as an ice skating director and coach.

In 1982, Coach Stanislav Zhuk broke up their partnership and partnered Kadyrkaev with Marina Cherkasova. However, that partnership did not last and Kadyrkaev moved to Leningrad to skate with Elena Kvitchenko.

Kvitchenko and Kadyrkaev were coached by Tamara Moskvina and Igor Moskvin. During their career, they won the 1987 Winter Universiade and competed at both the World Figure Skating Championships and European Figure Skating Championships. They were the 1989 Soviet Figure Skating Championships silver medalists. They turned professional in 1989 and toured with the Ice Capades.

Kadyrkaev now works as a coach in Ashburn, VA in the United States. His former students include Tamar Katz and Igor Matsipura.

Competitive highlights

With Kvitchenko

With Nikitiuk

References

Living people
Soviet male pair skaters
Uzbekistani male pair skaters
World Junior Figure Skating Championships medalists
Universiade medalists in figure skating
Year of birth missing (living people)
Universiade gold medalists for the Soviet Union
Competitors at the 1987 Winter Universiade